The 2004 Finlandia Trophy is an annual senior-level international figure skating competition held in Finland. It was held in Helsinki on October 9–10, 2004. Skaters competed in the disciplines of men's singles and ladies' singles.

Results

Men

Ladies

External links
 2004 Finlandia Trophy results

Finlandia Trophy
Finlandia Trophy, 2004
Finlandia Trophy, 2004